Richii (Arabic: ريتشى) (born Richard Abicair, on August 17, 1989 in Melbourne, Australia) is a singer, dancer, songwriter, and music producer whose popularity can be attributed to his Arabic singing in a Western style and heavy incorporation of Western electropop elements in his music and performances. Richii's first two singles both spent multiple weeks in the No.1 position on Lebanese charts in the weeks after their releases.

Musical career 

After signing a management contract with producer Hadii Sharara and moving from Australia to Lebanon at 19 years old', Richii released his first single "Dayeb Wehyatik" with an accompanying music video. The song became the No. 1 Most Requested Song on the MelodyArabia song charts. for a number of weeks in the summer of 2009. "Dayeb Wehyatik" was featured in an episode of the LBC TV drama series No2tet 7ub. Because of his young image and pop music style, some people portrayed him to be the "Lebanese Justin Bieber".

Richii released his second single "Ana Lubnaneyoun", a patriotic dance track, in December 2009. The video, which came almost a year later, was both acclaimed and heavily criticised due to its Western-style video for a Lebanese patriotic song, but the song received heavy rotation on radio as a result. Due to its heavy play in nightclubs and patriotic lyrics, it was deemed 'the official club anthem of Beirut’s nightlife’. Richii, with his director May Elias (chief editor of the Arts section in Elaph.com) premiered the video for 'Ana Lubnaneyoun' on Orbit TV station 'Al Youm' during the '3youn Beirut' or 'Eyes on Beirut' segment.

On Valentine's Day, Richii released to select radios a promotional single called ‘Valentine’ which he dedicated to his fans.

His single "Gowa Hodny" was released in June 2011 and it features a summer-styled dance video.

Richii has performed at two large concert events: Byblos Festival in 2010 and Dhour El Choueir 'immigrants festival' in 2009, which celebrated the diversity and vitality immigrants brought to Lebanon. Richii was asked to perform due to his Australian upbringing and subsequent immigration to Lebanon in 2009.

Discography 
 Insane
 Gowa 
 Hodny 
 Dayeb 
 Wehyatek 
 Valentine 
 Ana Lubnanyoun 
 Eternity (June 2013)

Video clips

References

External links 
 RICHII Official Website
 Facebook Page
 Twitter Account

Australian emigrants to Lebanon
21st-century Lebanese male singers
1989 births
Living people